Abdul Hamid (1886–1963), popularly known as Minister Abdul Hamid, was a Bengali lawyer, educationist and politician. He was a former president and education minister of the Assam Legislative Council. From 1947 to 1954, he served as the Education Minister of East Bengal.

Early life and family 
Abdul Hamid was born in 1886, to a Bengali Muslim family from Pathantula in Sylhet. His father was Abdul Qadir, brother of Moulvi Abdul Karim. His sister, Hafiza Banu, was the mother of politician Abu Ahmad Abdul Hafiz and the paternal grandmother of Bangladeshi ministers Abul Maal Abdul Muhith and AK Abdul Momen and National Professor Dr. Shahla Khatun.

Career 
He was a former president and education minister of the Assam Legislative Council from 1924 to 1937. Qazi Nazrul Islam visited Abdul Hamid's home during his stay in Sylhet. In 1937, he was appointed as the deputy leader of the Assam Provincial Muslim League until the Partition of India in 1947.  From 1947 to 1954, he served as the Education Minister of East Bengal.

Death and legacy
Abdul Hamid died in 1963. The Minister Abdul Hamid Road in Pathantula, Sylhet was named after him in his honour, as well as the Abdul Hamid Government Primary School in nearby Masimpur, Sylhet.

References

1963 deaths
1886 births
People from Sylhet
People of East Pakistan